The Days may refer to:

Music
The Days (band), British band
"The Days" (song), 2014 single by Avicii
"The Days", song by Patrick Wolf from Lupercalia
"The Days", song by Shinhwa from Winter Story
"I Giorni", song by Ludovico Einaudi from I Giorni
"Les Jours", song by Charles Aznavour from Aznavour toujours
"Les Jours", song by Constance Amiot from 12eme Parallele

Other uses
The Days (1993 film), a Chinese film
The Days (2006 film), a Canadian short drama film
The Days (TV series), 2004 TV series
The Days (book) (Arabic: Al-Ayyam) an autobiography by Taha Hussein

See also
Day (disambiguation)
The Day (disambiguation)